Garhwal Kingdom was an independent Himalayan kingdom in the current north-western Himalayan state of Uttarakhand, India, founded in 688 CE by Kanak Pal, the progenitor of the  Panwar dynasty that ruled over the kingdom uninterrupted until 1803 CE.

The kingdom was divided into two parts during the British Raj, namely: the princely state of Garhwal and the Garhwal District of British India. During this period, the princely state of Garhwal was one of the States of the Punjab Hills which became part of the Punjab Hill States Agency although it was not under the Punjab Province administration. The princely state of Garhwal or Independent Garhwal consisted of the present day Tehri Garhwal district and most of the Uttarkashi district. This former state acceded to the Union of India in August 1949 CE.

Etymology 
The exact origin of the word 'Garhwal' is unknown, though it is believed to be derived from the title ‘Garh-wala’ (Owner of Forts) given to the ruler Ajay Pal, who is said to have consolidated 52 principalities to form the kingdom in the 14th century. After this conquest the domain under Ajay Pal is said to have been called 'Garhwal', possibly due to the numerous forts in the region.

The name of the region and its people prior to Ajay Pal is unknown though some historians like Atkinson have alluded to ‘Khasadeśa’ (Land of the Khasas) and Sircar has stated that ‘Strīrājya’ (Kingdom of Women) as the ancient name of Garhwal and Kumaon. The earliest reference to places in this region are in the Skanda Purana as 'Kedarakhanda' and in the Mahabharata as 'Himavat' to describe the area that contained Gangadwar (Haridwar and Kankhal), Badrinath, Gandhamardan, and Kailash.

History

Ancient

Traditionally the region finds mention in various Hindu scriptures as Kedarkhand being home to the Garhwali people. Garhwal kingdom was dominated by Rajputs. The Kuninda Kingdom also flourished around the 2nd century BC. Later this region came under the rule of Katyuri kings, who ruled unified Kumaon and Garhwal regions from Katyur Valley, Baijnath, starting 6th century AD and eventually fading by the 11th century AD, after their fall Kurmanchal was divided into numerous small principalities and they eventually lost the control over garhwal region and the region fragmented into several small forts (garh). Huen Tsang, the Chinese traveller, who visited the region around 629 AD, mentions a Kingdom of Brahmapura in the region.

Based on the testimony of inscriptions (the earliest dating back to the 4th century AD), literary accounts, and local traditions it may be suggested that Far-Western Region of Nepal and Uttarakhand formed one single polity for centuries under the Katyuri kings. Therefore, both regions inherit a shared past or collective memory. In the Bharat/Jagar of Maula, Jiyarani, a Katyuri princess, as narrated in Doti (modern-day Nepal) and Uttarakhand (present-day India) is an example of this common heritage.

In the book of Rahul Sankrityayan, Himalaya Parichaya: Garwahl (Allahabad 1953) it is written that, "The kings of Kumaon-Garhwal were called, Kedare Khasamandale which means Kedar region as the residence of Khas people".

The royal dynasty of Garhwal started with Kanak Pal. Garhwal Kingdom was founded in 823 AD, when Kanak Pal, the prince of Malwa (present day Madhya Pradesh), on his visit to the Badrinath Temple, met Raja Bhanu Pratap, the ruler of Chandpur Garhi, one of the 52 Garhs of Garhwal. Raja Bhanu Pratap had no sons. The King married his only daughter to the prince and subsequently handed over his kingdom, the fortress town. Kanak Pal and his descendants of Panwar dynasty, gradually conquered all the independent fortresses (Garhs) belonging to its 52 small chieftains, and ruled the whole of Garhwal Kingdom for the next 916 years, up to 1804 AD.

Medieval
In 1358, the 37th ruler, Ajay Pal, brought all the minor principalities for the Garhwal region, under his own rule, and founded the Garhwal Kingdom, with Devalgarh as its capital, which he later shifted to Srinagar. Balbhadra Shah (r. 1575–1591), was the first Raja of Garhwal to use the title Shah. The capital was shifted to Srinagar by Mahipat Shah who ascended to the throne in 1622, and further consolidated his rule over most parts of Garhwal, though he died early in 1631, though his seven-year-old son, Prithvi Shah ascended to the throne after him, the Kingdom was ruled by Mahipat Shah's wife, Rani Karnavati for many years to come, during which she successfully defended the kingdom against invaders and repelled an attack of Mughal army led by Najabat Khan in 1640, and in time received the nickname of 'Nakti Rani' as she used to chop off the noses of any invader to the kingdom, as the Mughal invaders of the period realised. Monuments erected by her still exist in Dehradun district at Nawada.

The next important ruler was Fateh Shah, remained the King of Garhwal from 1684 to 1716, and is most known for taking part in the Battle of Bhangani on 18 September 1688, where combined forces of many Rajas of the Shivalik Hills (Pahari rajas) fought with 10th Sikh Guru Gobind Singh's army. During his reign, Sikh Guru and the ex-communicated eldest son of Har Rai, Ram Rai settled here, upon recommendations of Aurangzeb, which eventually led to the establishment of modern town of Dehradun. Fateh Shah died in 1716, and his son Upendra Shah died within a year of ascending to the throne in 1717, subsequently Pradip Shah ascended and his ruled led to rising fortunes of the Kingdom, this in turn attracted invaders, like Najib-ud-daula Governor of Saharanpur, who invaded in 1757 along with his Rohilla Army and captured Dehradun. However, in 1770, the Garhwali forces defeated the Rohillas and retrieved possession of the Dun region.

'Harshadev' a former minister of Kumaon Kingdom and king Lalit Shah joined forces to attack Kumaon and captured almora the seat of Kumaon Kingdom, expelled the ruling king Mohan Chand and placed his own younger son on the throne. However, later Mohan Chand on (1786–1788) overthrew Pradyumna Shah and retained Kumaon Kingdom.<ref>{{Cite book|last=Pande, Badri Datt|title=History of Kumaon (English version of "Kumaon Ka Itihas").|date=1993|publisher=Shyam Prakashan|isbn=81-900209-4-3|oclc=833063116}}</ref>

In 1791 Gorkha forces of the Kingdom of Nepal, invaded Kumaon and took control of most of the hill country, expelling or subduing most of the rajas.

After defeating kumaon, Gorkha Kingdom attacked Garhwal and Garhwali forces suffered heavy defeat, and Pradyumna Shah first escaped from Srinagar to Dehradun and then to Saharanpur to organise forces, but was eventually killed in the Battle of Khurbura (Dehradun) in January 1804 while his brother, Pritam Shah, was taken in captivity to Nepal by the Gorkhas. The Battle of Khurbura took place on Magh 20, 1860 V.S. (January 1804) where the Gorkhas were under the command of Bada Kaji Amar Singh Thapa.

Several causes are attributed to this defeat. Garhwal was perpetually in political turmoil since the time of Raja Jayakrit Shah and this was sapping the vitality of the kingdom. Nature also played havoc in the form of a famine before the Gorkha onslaught from 1795 to 1795. Garhwal had not yet recovered from the famine when a devastating earthquake struck the region.

 Twelve-year Gorkha occupation (Gorkhyani) 

The Garhwal kings went into exile in British territory as the Gorkhas began their twelve-year rule over Garhwal region.

The Gorkhas ruled Garhwal with an iron fist. Their excessive taxation policy, iniquitous judicial system, slavery, torture and lack of civilised administrative set up made the Gorkha rulers extremely unpopular amongst their subjects. Cultivation declined rapidly and villages were deserted. During the Gorkha rule, a revenue settlement for Garhwal was undertaken in 1811. The rates were so high that the land-owners found it difficult to honour, and the Gorkhas sold hundreds of their family members into slavery in satisfaction of the arrears. If a person or his family members were not purchased as slaves in auction, such people were sent to Bhimgoda near Har Ki Pauri, Haridwar for selling. The Gorkhas are said to have established a slave market at Das Bazar in Haridwar. Harak Dev Joshi, a prominent minister from the Kumaon court wrote letters to Fraser, the resident at Delhi describing the atrocities committed by the Gorkhas on the Garhwali people. British writer and explorer Captain F.V. Raper (of the 10th Bengal) has written an eye-witness account of it in the Asiatic Researches (vol. xi.):

Scottish travel writer and artist, J. B. Fraser wrote:

The Mukhtiyar (prime minister) of Nepal, Bhimsen Thapa imposed a general restriction on human trafficking in Garhwal, Sirmur and other areas in 1812 A.D. Anti-bribery regulations were issued against regional governors and declared it illegal to give or take any form of bribes or gifts from people. He established Hulak (postal) system through a relay of porters up to Yamuna river in Garhwal. Regulations issued in July 1809 states: 
 The royal court sent the following orders regarding abolition of slave trading: 

Defeat of the Gorkhas and split of Garhwal Kingdom 
The occupation of the kingdom by the Gorkhas went unopposed from 1803 to 1814 until a series of encroachments by the Gorkhas on British territory led to the Anglo-Nepalese War in 1814. Sudarshan Shah, son and heir of the defeated ruler of the Kingdom of Garhwal who was in exile in British territory, saw his chance and entered into an alliance with the British in 1812. When the expected war erupted, he joined forces with them in the conquest of the hill territories. At the war's end on 21 April 1815, as a result of the Treaty of Sugauli, the British annexed half of the Kingdom of Garhwal (Pauri Garhwal) and converted the other half (Tehri Garhwal) into a subsidiary princely state.

 Formation of the Princely State of Tehri Garhwal 

Sudarshan Shah, the heir to the Kingdom of Garhwal received approximately half his ancestral territories, limited to western Garhwal region and received recognition as Raja of a new princely state of Garhwal. The British established their rule over the eastern half of the Garhwal region, which lies east of Alaknanda and Mandakini river, which was later on known as British Garhwal and Dehradun, along with Kumaon, which was merged with British India as a result of the Treaty of Sugauli. The former Kumaon Kingdom was joined with the eastern half of the Garhwal region and was governed as a chief-commissionership, also known as the Kumaon Province, on the non-regulation system.

Since the capital Srinagar was now part of the British Garhwal, a new capital was established at Tehri, giving the name of Tehri state (popularly known as Tehri Garhwal).

Sudarshan Shah died in 1859, and was succeeded by Bhawani Shah, who in turn was succeeded by Pratap Shah in 1872. The ruler was given the title of Raja, but after 1913, he was honoured with the title of Maharaja. The King was entitled to an 11 gun salute and had a privy purse of 300,000 Rupees. In 1919, Maharaja Narendra Shah shifted the capital from Tehri to a new town, which was named after him, Narendranagar.

India's independence
During the Quit India Movement people from this region actively worked for the independence of India. Ultimately, when the country was declared independent in 1947, the inhabitants of Tehri Riyasat (Garhwal State) started their movement to free themselves from the clutches of the Maharaja Narendra Shah (Panwar).

Due to this movement, the situation became out of his control and it was difficult for him to rule over the region. Consequently, the 60th king of Panwar dynasty, Manabendra Shah, the last ruling Maharaja of the Garhwal Kingdom (1946–1949), accepted the sovereignty of the Union of India. Tehri Riyasat was merged into the Garhwal District of United Provinces (later renamed to Uttar Pradesh) and was given the status of a new district, the Tehri Garhwal district. Subsequently, on 24 February 1960, the state government separated one of its tehsils which was given the status of a separate district named Uttarkashi. It is currently part of the Garhwal Division of the Uttarakhand state of India which was carved out of Uttar Pradesh in 2000. Former royal palace of the Maharaja of Tehri Garhwal at Narendranagar, now houses the Ananda in the Himalayas spa, established 2000.

 Flag of Garhwal 
The flag of Garhwal was known as Badrinathji Ki Pataka or Garuda Dhwaj. It was in use since pre-1803 as a symbol of Garhwal State; and continued to be used from 1803 to 1949 as the symbol of princely state of Garhwal, (a.k.a. Tehri Garhwal / Garhwal Raj). After 1949, this flag is the symbol of Royal family and Lord Badrinath. The colour scheme is two equal stripes of white (top) and green (bottom) horizontally placed and the symbol used was Garuda (the celestial vehicle of Lord Vishnu). White stands for purity, peace, tranquillity with snow as an additional meaning for Himalayan state. Green stands for agriculture, greenery, prosperity and progress. According to Filcher11 (1984), the colours represent the snow of the Himalaya and the forests of the state. In the centre the crest of the coat of arms is placed – an eagle with expanded wings (Garuda) is the vehicle of Lord Badrinath / Vishnu with emphasis on Garhwal being God's own abode.

"As Garuda is where Lord Vishnu is, it celebrates association of Garhwal with Lord Vishnu. As Lord Himself has a role sustaining the world, the state of Garhwal is sustained by support of God. It is in a pose with expanded wings which shows readiness and preparation to soar high. Thus it gives a meaning of divinity, majesty and ambitious preparedness with readiness to embark on great undertakings."

This verse was used with special fervour in Garhwal due to the Flag being Garuda Dhwaj. The verse was used by ruler of princely state himself while bidding farewell to state forces.

 Rulers of Garhwal 
Mola Ram the 18th century painter, poet, historian and diplomat of Garhwal wrote the historical work Garhrajvansh Ka Itihas (History of the Garhwal royal dynasty) which is the only source of information about several Garhwal rulers. 

 Accession to India  

Manabendra Shah was the last Maharaja of Tehri Garhwal before the princely state joined the newly independent India in 1947. He succeeded to the throne when his father Narendra Shah abdicated throne (on health grounds) on 26 May 1946. Manabendra Shah known as 'Bolanda Badri' (living incarnation of Lord Vishnu) was the 60st guardian of the temple of Badrinath in Garhwal. After serving on the Burma Front during the Second World War and retiring as a Lieutenant Colonel from the British Indian Army, Manabendra Shah ruled the 4,800-square mile only Tehri Garhwal State from 1946 until 1949, but was proud of having been one of the first to sign the Instrument of Accession, which he had helped to negotiate, with the Government of India. After the independence of India, he was a long-serving member of the Parliament of India, first as an Indian National Congress MP and later as a Bharatiya Janata Party MP. He represented Tehri Garhwal constituency eight times in the Lok Sabha. Manabendra Shah also served as Indian ambassador to Ireland from 1980 to 1983.

His son Manujendra Shah campaigned unsuccessfully to succeed to his father's Lok Sabha seat representing the Bharatiya Janata Party (BJP) in 2007. Manujendra Shah's wife, Mala Rajya Laxmi Shah, is the current BJP MP from Tehri Garhwal. In 2017, she and her husband, Manujendra Shah, passed on the royal baton to their daughter, Kshirja Kumari Devi in a ceremony on Vasant Panchami at the Ananda Palace in Narendranagar to anoint her as heir to the titular royal legacy.

See also
Garhwali language
Garhwali people
List of Hindu empires and dynasties
List of Rajput dynasties
Tehri Garhwal House
Panwar Dynasty

References

 The History of a Himalayan princely state: Change, conflicts, and awakening : an interpretative history of Princely State of Tehri Garhwal, U.P., A.D. 1815 to 1949 A.D., by Atul Saklani. Delhi : Durga Publications, 1987.

Further reading
 Tehri Garhwal State Constitution: As Enacted by H.H. Maharaja Manabendra Shah Under the Rajagyan Dated 27 May 1946, by Tehri Garhwal (Princely State). Published by Mafasilite Print. Works, 1946.

External links
 Genealogy of Tehri Garhwal (princely state)
 Garhwali songs and Uttarakhand folk songs 

States and territories established in the 820s
States and territories disestablished in 1804
States and territories established in 1816
States and territories disestablished in 1949
Princely states of India
Rajputs
Garhwal division
History of Uttarakhand
9th-century establishments in India
823 establishments
1804 disestablishments in India
1816 establishments in India
1949 disestablishments in India